Traunsee is a lake in the Salzkammergut, Upper Austria, Austria. Its surface is approximately 24.5 km2 and its maximum depth of 191 metres makes it the deepest and by volume largest lake located entirely within Austrian territory; only Lake Constance on the border is deeper and bigger. 
It is a popular tourist destination, and its attractions include Schloss Ort, a medieval castle.

At the North end of the lake is Gmunden, at the south end is Ebensee.  The lake is surrounded by mountains, including the Traunstein, and a number of other towns and villages surround the lake, including Altmünster and Traunkirchen.

There is a local legend that speaks of a Waterhorse that lives in the lake. Records mention a mermaid riding on the back of a creature who lives in the waters. Locals refer to it as "Lungy" and photographs have been taken of the creature.

External links

Lakes of Upper Austria
Upper Austrian Prealps